The enzyme fluoroacetyl-CoA thioesterase (EC 3.1.2.29; systematic name fluoroacetyl-CoA hydrolase) catalyses the following reaction:

 fluoroacetyl-CoA + H2O  fluoroacetate + CoA

Fluoroacetate is extremely toxic.

References

External links 
 

EC 3.1.2